Spencermartinsia pretoriensis is an endophytic fungus that might be a latent pathogen. It was found on Acacia karroo, a common tree in southern Africa.

References

Further reading
Jami, Fahimeh, et al. "Greater Botryosphaeriaceae diversity in healthy than associated diseased Acacia karroo tree tissues." Australasian Plant Pathology 42.4 (2013): 421–430.
Pitt, Wayne M., Jose Ramon Úrbez-Torres, and Florent P. Trouillas. "Dothiorella vidmadera, a novel species from grapevines in Australia and notes on Spencermartinsia." Fungal Diversity 61.1 (2013): 209–219.

External links 
MycoBank

Botryosphaeriales
Fungi described in 2012
Fungal plant pathogens and diseases